John Lockhart may refer to:

John Lockhart-Ross (1721–1790), known as John Lockhart from 1721 to 1760, Royal Navy officer
John Gibson Lockhart (1794–1854), Scottish writer and editor
John Ingram Lockhart (1766–1835), British politician, also known as John Wastie
John Ingram Lockhart (writer) (1812–1889), English translator and radical, nephew of the politician
John Bruce Lockhart (1889–1956), Scottish cricketer and schoolmaster
John Lockhart (judge) (1935–2006), Australian judge in the Federal Court of Australia